Georgi Kaloyanov (born 7 April 1984) is a Bulgarian footballer who currently plays as a midfielder for FC Karnobat.

Career
Kaloyanov previously played for Chernomorets Burgas in the A PFG.

References

External links
 Profile at sport.burgas24.bg
 Profile at sportal.bg

Living people
1984 births
Bulgarian footballers
First Professional Football League (Bulgaria) players
Second Professional Football League (Bulgaria) players
FC Chernomorets Burgas players
FC Pomorie players
PFC Nesebar players
Neftochimic Burgas players

Association football midfielders